A royal servant was a freeman in the Kingdom of Hungary in the 13th century who owned possession and was subordinate only to the king. The expression was documented for the first time in a charter issued in 1217. By the end of the 13th century, the use of the expression ceased, and the "royal servants" merged into the nobility of the kingdom and they formed the basis of the lesser nobility.

In the 11-12th centuries, the ancestors of the "royal servants" can be found among the "freemen" who provided military services to the kings and whose troops were led by the kings and not by the heads of the "royal counties". "Castle warriors" also increased the number of "royal servants" if the king liberated them from the services they had been obliged to provide to the heads of the royal castles. Even serfs could receive their liberties provided that the king not only liberated them personally but also granted them possessions.

The "royal servants'" freedom became endangered during the reign of King Andrew II (1205-1235) who granted whole "royal counties" (i.e., all the royal domains in the counties) to his partisans. The new lords endeavoured to expand their supremacy over the "royal servants" who owned possessions in the county. However, the "royal servants'" commenced to organize themselves and they persuaded the king to issue the Golden Bull, a royal decree summarizing and confirming their following liberties:
 "royal servants" could not be arrested without a verdict;
 they were exempt from taxation;
 they were entitled to dispose of their properties in their last will in case they died without a male descendant, with the exception of the quarter due to their daughters;
 "royal servants" were exempted from the jurisdiction of the heads of the counties;
 outside the realm, they were obliged to serve in the king's army only for remuneration.

The provisions of the Golden Bull were later confirmed several times by the kings (it was King Andrew II himself who confirmed them for the first time in 1231) and therefore, they formed the basis of the "cardinal liberties" of the nobility in the Kingdom of Hungary. Although, "royal servants" who lived in some provinces of the Kingdom (e.g., the "royal servants" of Transylvania and in Slavonia) could not enjoy all the liberties confirmed by the Golden Bull, because they still were obliged to pay their special taxes, but by the second half of the 14th century, they also became an integrated part of the nobility.

Following the Golden Bull, a deed issued, in 1232, by the "royal servants" living in Zala county indicated a new step towards the formation of institutes of their self-government: in the deed, they judged the lawsuit of Bartholomew, Bishop of Veszprém, which proved that the counties, that had been formerly the basic units of royal administration, commenced to turn into an administrative unit governed by the developing nobility.
From the 1230s, the terminology used in the royal charters when they referred to "royal servants" began to change and they were more and more frequently mentioned as "noble servants" and later, as "nobles or servants", while finally, the Decree of 1267 issued by King Béla IV (1235-1270) identified the "royal servants" with the nobles. Thenceforward, the expression vanished from the documents, and the descendants of the "royal servants" were mentioned as nobiles. Following 1267, only the Hungarian word for the two or four members of the County Courts elected by the nobiles (i.e., szolgabíró that literally means "servants' judge") reserved the memory of the expression.

See also
 Castle warriors

References

Sources
 Bán, Péter (editor): Magyar Történelmi Fogalomtár; Gondolat, Budapest, 1989; .
 Kristó, Gyula (editor): Korai Magyar Történeti Lexikon - 9-14. század (Encyclopedia of the Early Hungarian History - 9-14th centuries); Akadémiai Kiadó, 1994, Budapest; .
 Kristó, Gyula: Magyarország története - 895-1301 (The History of Hungary - 895-1301); Osiris Kiadó, 1998, Budapest; .

Medieval Kingdom of Hungary
Hungarian noble titles